Marguerite "Meg" Kelly Rizzoli is an American television soap opera screenwriter who has received three Daytime Emmy Awards.

Biography
Kelly was born as one of four children to journalists Thomas and Marguerite Kelly. Her brother was Michael Kelly, a magazine editor and journalist who was killed in 2003 while covering the Iraq War, and one of her sisters is Katie Kelly, a journalist and children's book writer. A former actress, she joined Arena Stage at the age of about twelve or thirteen, touring Russia with them. In 1978 she began studying at the Catholic University of America before dropping out to attend the Circle in the Square Theatre School in New York City from 1980 to 1982. In New York she landed a Broadway role from 1988 to 1989 in a run of the play The Devil's Disciple. She moved to Los Angeles with her husband, actor Tony Rizzoli. She began writing screenplays and was a finalist for the Nicholl Fellowship, turning to screenwriting for daytime TV shows because she could easily integrate that job with raising her children.

Positions held
As the World Turns
Script Writer: 2000 - April 6, 2005

Days of Our Lives
Co-Head Writer (with Hogan Sheffer): October 5, 2006 - January 24, 2008
Script Writer: September 6, 2006 - January 24, 2008

One Life to Live
Breakdown Writer: July 12, 2005 - Nov 21, 2006

Awards and nominations
Daytime Emmy Award
Win, 2002, 2004 and 2005, Best Writing, As the World Turns
Nomination, 2003, Best Writing, As the World Turns

References

External links
 

American soap opera writers
Daytime Emmy Award winners
American women television writers
Women soap opera writers
American stage actresses
Catholic University of America alumni
Circle in the Square Theatre School alumni
Year of birth missing (living people)
Living people
Place of birth missing (living people)